Agustín Héctor Castro Rodríguez (29 November 1904 – 15 September 1960) was a Uruguayan football player and coach. He scored Uruguay's first ever goal in a World Cup against Peru at the inaugural FIFA World Cup in 1930 a tournament they would go on to win.

Early life
Castro was born in Montevideo. When he was 13, he accidentally amputated his right forearm while using an electric saw, which gave origin to his nickname, El manco (meaning "the one-armed", or "the maimed").

Playing career

Club career
Castro began his career in 1923/24 with Nacional and was the first player to score in a World Cup game for Uruguay. At Nacional he won three Uruguayan Championships (1924, 1933, 1934), before retiring in 1936.

1933 Uruguayan Championship
In the 1933 Uruguayan Championship, Peñarol player Braulio Castro scored a controversial goal in the championship match where the ball clearly went out of play, but rebounded off a kinesiologist's medicine cabinet back into play in the build-up to the goal. This turned out to be the only goal of the game, and the opposition, Nacional, felt very hard done by, and three of their players were sent off, for assaulting the referee in annoyance at the goal. This meant that the referee, Telésforo Rodríguez, was unable to continue through injury, so one of the assistant referees, Luis Scandroglio, stepped in, and immediately abandoned the match due to bad light, after seventy minutes.

Over two months later, on 30 July, the League Board decided to disallow the goal, and also rescinded one of the three aforementioned sendings-off (that of Ulises Chifflet). They also ruled that the final twenty minutes would be played at Estadio Centenario, but behind closed doors to try to avoid the same controversy which had plagued the original encounter. The match went ahead behind closed doors, and there were no goals in the twenty minutes. In a highly unorthodox move, two sessions of extra-time were played (the usual allowance would be a single session), the score remained goalless. Nacional's fans remember this game as the "9 contra 11" ("9 against 11") since their team played the remaining 20 minutes plus both overtimes (totalling over 80 minutes) with nine players.

A second playoff, which consisted of a standard match, followed once again by two sessions of extra-time, was played on 2 September, but still the deadlock wasn't broken.

A third playoff was contested on 18 November, and Héctor Castro played a vital role in this match, scoring a hat-trick which meant twice equalising as well as scoring the winning goal for Nacional, in a 3–2 win over Peñarol, which finally settled the Uruguayan Championship, almost six months after the controversial first playoff. This controversial playoff also meant that the Uruguayan Championship of 1933 was bizarrely not awarded until November 1934.

International career
Castro made his debut for the Uruguay national football team in November 1923. He played his final match for la Celeste in August 1935 having played 25 times, scoring 18 goals.

1928 Olympics
Playing for Uruguay at the 1928 Olympic Games Castro won a gold medal.

1930 FIFA World Cup
Castro's goal in the World Cup Final helped Uruguay win the first FIFA World Cup in 1930. He also scored the first ever goal at Estadio Centenario, against Peru, in that tournament.

South American Championship
Castro played in South American Championship-winning teams in 1926 and 1935.

International goals
Uruguay's goal tally first

Coaching career
After retiring as a player, Castro worked as a football coach with Nacional. He won the Uruguayan championship in 1940, 1941, 1942, 1943, and again in 1952.

Later life and death
Castro died in 1960 at the age of 55, from a heart attack.

Honours

As a Player
FIFA World Cup: 1930
Olympic Games: 1928
Copa América: 1926, 1935
Uruguayan Championship: 1924, 1933, 1934

As a Coach
Uruguayan Championship: 1940, 1941, 1942, 1943, 1952

As an Assistant Coach
Uruguayan Championship: 1939

Castro was Assistant coach to William Reaside in 1939 but was Coach in the finals for that year's tournament. Therefore, he was Nacional's coach at all five years of the Quinquenio de Oro's closing games.

References

 

1904 births
1930 FIFA World Cup players
1960 deaths
Association football forwards
Olympic footballers of Uruguay
Uruguayan footballers
Uruguayan Primera División players
Club Nacional de Football players
Uruguay international footballers
Footballers at the 1928 Summer Olympics
Olympic gold medalists for Uruguay
FIFA World Cup-winning players
Footballers from Montevideo
Uruguayan football managers
Uruguay national football team managers
Uruguayan amputees
Olympic medalists in football
Copa América-winning players
Medalists at the 1928 Summer Olympics
Club Nacional de Football managers
Association footballers with limb difference
Rampla Juniors managers